The Halfway Creek Site is an archaeological site located near Carnestown, Florida. On August 15, 1980, it was added to the U.S. National Register of Historic Places.

References

External links
 Collier County listings at National Register of Historic Places
 Collier County listings at Florida's Office of Cultural and Historical Programs

Archaeological sites in Florida
National Register of Historic Places in Collier County, Florida
National Register of Historic Places in Big Cypress National Preserve